The Tar Springs Formation is a geologic formation in Kentucky. It preserves fossils dating back to the Carboniferous period.

See also
 List of fossiliferous stratigraphic units in Kentucky

References

 

Carboniferous Indiana
Carboniferous Kentucky
Carboniferous Illinois
Carboniferous southern paleotropical deposits